The 1982–83 Segunda División B season was the 5th since its establishment. The first matches of the season were played on 20 September 1981, and the season ended on 23 May 1982.

Overview before the season
40 teams joined the league, including four relegated from the 1980–81 Segunda División and 6 promoted from the 1980–81 Tercera División. The composition of the groups was determined by the Royal Spanish Football Federation, attending to geographical criteria.

Relegated from Segunda División
Granada CF
Palencia CF
Barakaldo CF
AgD Ceuta

Promoted from Tercera División'''

Endesa Andorra
CD Antequerano
Sporting Atlético
CF Reus Deportivo
Lorca Deportiva
Club Erandio

Group I

Teams
Teams from Aragon, Asturias, Basque Country, Canary Islands, Castile and León, Catalonia, Galicia, La Rioja and Madrid.

League table

Results

Top goalscorers

Top goalkeepers

Group II
Teams from Andalusia, Andorra, Aragon, Balearic Islands, Canary Islands, Castilla–La Mancha, Catalonia, Ceuta, Extremadura, Madrid, Region of Murcia and Valencian Community.

Teams

League table

Results

Top goalscorers

Top goalkeepers

Notes

Segunda División B seasons
3
Spain